The 1990–91 season was Dinamo Zagreb's 45th season in the Yugoslav First League. It proved to be their last season played in the Yugoslav league system. Following the season's completion and due to the breakup of Yugoslavia, Croatian clubs, including Dinamo, decided to leave the league to form Prva HNL.

Dinamo Zagreb finished runners-up in the league, with ten points behind champions Red Star Belgrade. In their last appearance in the Yugoslav Cup Dinamo have beaten Borac Bosanski Šamac in the round of 32 (7–0) and FK Sarajevo in the round of 16 (5–1 on aggregate) before reaching the quarter-finals where they were knocked out by Borac Banja Luka (2–3 on aggregate).

In European competitions Dinamo were drawn to play Italy's Atalanta in the 1990–91 UEFA Cup. After a goalless draw in Bergamo in the first leg, the return leg at Maksimir ended in a 1–1 draw, with Atalanta going through on away goals rule.

Players

Squad
The following is the full list of players who appeared in league matches for Dinamo in the 1990–91 season.

Statistics
The following table lists appearances and goals of all players who represented Dinamo in the 1990–91 season. Only league matches and goals are taken into account. Dražen Ladić had most appearances, having played in 35 out of 36 matches, while Davor Šuker was the club's top scorer with 22 goals in 32 league appearances.

First League

Matches

Classification

See also
1990–91 Yugoslav First League
1990–91 Yugoslav Cup

References

External links
1990–91 Yugoslav First League final tables at Rec.Sport.Soccer Statistics Foundation
Yugoslavian First Division 1990-91 article by Jonathan Wilson at When Saturday Comes (July 2007)
Almanah YU-fudbal 90-91., p. 8-9

GNK Dinamo Zagreb seasons
Dinamo Zagreb